Rosairil Asrul Mat Nor (born 14 September 1977) is a Malaysian football player who recently played for Kelantan FA in Malaysia Super League. Prior to Terengganu, he played with Terengganu FA and three Kelantan club team from 2001 until 2004.

References 

Malaysian footballers
Living people
1977 births
People from Kelantan
Association football defenders
Association football midfielders
Terengganu FC players